The 2007 CAF Super Cup was the 15th CAF Super Cup, an annual football match in Africa organized by the Confederation of African Football (CAF), between the winners of the previous season's two CAF club competitions, the African Cup of Champions Clubs and the CAF Confederation Cup.

The match took place on 18 February 2007, on neutral stadium at Addis Ababa Stadium in Addis Ababa, Ethiopia, celebrating the CAF's 50th anniversary, between Al Ahly, the 2006 CAF Champions League winner, and ES Sahel, the 2006 CAF Confederation Cup winner.
Al-Ahly won the match by penalty shout-out 5–4, to retain the title, as the second team to win the tournament for three times after Zamalek SC.

Teams

Match details

References
 Al-Ahly Etoile du Sahel

2007
Étoile Sportive du Sahel matches
Al Ahly SC matches
Association football penalty shoot-outs